The 1938 Paris–Tours was the 33rd edition of the Paris–Tours cycle race and was held on 8 May 1938. The race started in Paris and finished in Tours. The race was won by Jules Rossi.

General classification

References

1938 in French sport
1938
May 1938 sports events